El nervio del volcán is the fourth and final album by Mexican rock band Caifanes, released in the summer of 1994.

With bassist Sabo Romo and keyboardist Diego Herrera out of the band since the previous year, Saúl Hernández (vocals), Alfonso André (drums), and Alejandro Marcóvich (guitars) were the remaining band members left to record Caifanes' fourth studio album in Los Angeles, California between February and April 1994. The album included the hit singles "Afuera" and "Aquí no es así".

A tour began throughout Mexico, United States, Central America, Colombia, Chile, and Argentina, ultimately ending with the band dissolving on August 18, 1995 on their final show in San Luis Potosí, Mexico. Hernández later formed a new incarnation of his previous band, Jaguares, due to legal disputes and fallout with lead guitar Alejandro Marcóvich.

Guest artists included Graham Nash, Stuart Hamm, Federico Fong, Yann Zaragoza and Cecilia Toussaint.

Track listing

Personnel

Caifanes
Saúl Hernández – vocals, 2nd rhythm guitar on "El año del dragón"
Alejandro Marcovich – electric and acoustic guitars, EBow on "Miedo" and "La Llorona"
Alfonso André – drums, percussion, drum programming on "Hasta que dejes de respirar"

Guests
Federico Fong – fretted and fretless basses
Yann Zaragoza – piano, Hammond organ, synthesizer (except on "Aquí no es así")
Cecilia Toussaint – choirs on "Afuera", "Aquí no es así", and "Hasta que dejes de respirar"
Lenny Castro – percussion
Stuart Hamm – fretless bass on "Quisiera ser alcohol"
Jerry Hey – trumpet on "Quisiera ser alcohol"
Jerry Goodman – electric violin on "El animal" and "Pero nunca me caí"
Graham Nash – harmonica on "Pero nunca me caí"
Jeffrey "Marty" Vanston – synthesizer on "Aquí no es así" and "Ayer me dijo un ave"

Certifications

References

Caifanes albums
1994 albums
Albums produced by Greg Ladanyi